Akhira massacre was a massacre of the emigrating Hindus of the then Dinajpur district near Baraihat on 17 April 1971 by the Pakistani army with collaboration from the local Razakars. It is estimated that around 100 Hindus were killed in the massacre.

Events 
In April 1971, a member of the Razakar forces, Kenan Uddin Sarkar of Ramchandrapur village under Parbatipur sub-division of Dinajpur district, assured 50 Hindu families of neighbouring Badarganj, Kholahati, Birampur, Aftabganj and Sherpur of a safe passage to India. He kept the Hindus confined at a place called Baraihat in present-day Phulbari Upazila. The Razakars and the Al-Badr militia looted the money and jewelry from Hindus during their confinement. After that another Razakar, an associate of Kenan Uddin Sarkar informed the Pakistani army. The Pakistani army took the hostage Hindus to Akhira, 100 metres from south of Baraihat. It was about 11 A.M. The Hindus were made to stand in a row beside a pond, the men in one line and the women and children in another. They were burst fired from machine guns. A few children and teenagers who were survived the burst fire, were bayonetted to death. According to eye witness accounts, after gunning down the men, the Pakistani soldiers turned their attention to the females, and brutally gang raped them at that spot. After the victory in the Liberation War, the local people executed Kenan Uddin Sarkar by the method of Jabiha.

Casualty 
The male members of the captive Hindu families were massacred by the Pakistani army. According to the most conservative reports, the casualty figure is 85. Eight local Muslims, who had witnessed the massacre were also killed later. According to other version, around 125 Hindus died in the massacre. Though there is no general consensus regarding the casualty figures, it is generally accepted around 100 Hindus were killed in the massacre.

Memorial 
No memorial has been erected at the mass killing site at Akhira. The local people organize Milad Mehfil and Quran Khawani in memory of the dead.

References 

Massacres in 1971
1971 in Bangladesh
1971 Bangladesh genocide
Massacres of Bengali Hindus in East Pakistan
Massacres of men
Massacres committed by Pakistan in East Pakistan
April 1971 events in Bangladesh
Violence against men in Asia